Waterloo CSD may refer to:
 Waterloo Community School District (Iowa)
 Waterloo Central School District (New York)